GhostBSD is a Unix-like operating system based on FreeBSD, with MATE as its default desktop environment (GNOME was the previous desktop environment) and an Xfce-desktop community based edition. It aims to be easy to install, ready-to-use and easy to use. The project goal is to combine security, privacy, stability, usability, openness, freedom and to be free of charge.

Prior to GhostBSD 18.10, the project was based on FreeBSD. In May 2018 it was announced that future versions of the operating system would be based on TrueOS. In 2020, with the discontinuation of TrueOS, GhostBSD switched back to FreeBSD.

Version history

FreeBSD based releases (1.0 - 11.1)

TrueOS-based releases (18.10 - 21.01.20) 

From GhostBSD 18.10 to 21.01.20, the project moved its base from FreeBSD to TrueOS. Following are TrueOS-based GhostBSD releases.

FreeBSD based releases (21.04.27 - present) 
Beginning from GhostBSD 21.04.27, the project has moved its base back to FreeBSD.

License 
GhostBSD was originally licensed under the 3-clause BSD license ("Revised BSD License", "New BSD License", or "Modified BSD License")

In 2014 Eric Turgeon re-licensed GhostBSD under 2-clause license ("Simplified BSD License" or "FreeBSD License"). GhostBSD contains some GPL-licensed software.

Recommended system requirements 
The following are the recommended requirements.
 AMD64 processor
 4 GB of RAM
 15 GB of free hard drive space
 Network access

See also 

 Comparison of BSD operating systems
 List of BSD operating systems
 FreeBSD
 Darwin (operating system)
 DesktopBSD
 MidnightBSD
 TrueOS
 NetBSD
 OpenBSD

References

External links 
 
 GhostBSD Documentation
 GhostBSD on DistroWatch
 GhostBSD on OpenSourceFeed Gallery

2010 software
FreeBSD